Fourth United States Army was a field army of the United States Army between 1932 and 1991.

History
In 1922, Fourth Army was organized as a unit of the Organized Reserves in New York City. It was allotted to the Regular Army as an inactive unit on 9 August 1932. It was activated 1 October 1933 and headquartered at the Presidio of San Francisco, California. In January 1944, Fourth Army moved its headquarters to Fort Sam Houston in San Antonio, Texas. It was redesignated Fourth United States Army on 1 January 1957.

Fourth Army remained in the Continental United States during World War II, largely responsible for the defense of the West Coast and training tactical units to operate efficiently in combat. During the 1960s, Fourth Army operated "Tigerland", an infantry training school at Louisiana's Fort Polk that prepared recruits for infantry combat in Vietnam. In July 1971, Fourth Army was consolidated with Fifth United States Army at Fort Sam Houston.

Between 1984 and 1991, Fourth Army was based at Fort Sheridan, Illinois. Lieutenant General James R. Hall served as the last commanding general, holding the position from 1989 until Fourth Army was inactivated in 1991.

Past commanders
 MG Johnson Hagood (1932–1933)
 MG Malin Craig (1933–1935)
 MG Paul B. Malone (1935–1936)
 MG George S. Simonds (1936–1938)
 LTG Albert Jesse Bowley Sr. (1938–1939)
 GEN John L. DeWitt (1939–1943)
 GEN William Hood Simpson (1943–1944)
 MG John P. Lucas (1944–1945)
 LTG Alexander Patch (1945)
 GEN Jonathan Mayhew Wainwright IV (1946–1947)
 GEN Thomas Troy Handy (1947–1949)
 MG Andrew D. Bruce (1949)
 LTG LeRoy Lutes (1949–1952)
 MG Hobart R. Gay (1952)
 GEN William M. Hoge (1952–1953)
 GEN John E. Dahlquist (1953)
 MG Haydon L. Boatner (1953)
 LTG Isaac D. White (1953–1955)
 LTG Samuel Tankersley Williams (1955)
 LTG John H. Collier (1955–1958)
 LTG Guy S. Meloy Jr. (1958–1961)
 LTG Donald Prentice Booth (1961–1962)
 LTG Carl H. Jark (1962–1964)
 LTG Robert W. Colglazier (1964–1966)
 LTG Thomas W. Dunn (1966–1967)
 LTG Lawrence J. Lincoln (1967–1968)
 LTG Harry H. Critz (1968–1971)
 LTG George G. O'Connor (1971)
 LTG George V. Underwood Jr. (1971)

 Unit inactive

 LTG Edward C. Peter II (1984–1986)
 LTG Frederic J. Brown III (1986–1989)
 LTG James R. Hall (1989–1991)

 Unit inactive

Notes

References

General references 
 History of the Fourth Army, Jack B. Beardwood, Washington, D.C., 1946 (N.P. Army Ground Force Study No. 18)

External links
 Fourth Army web page at globalsecurity.org
 Unit Profile in Armies, Corps, Divisions and Separate Brigades a publication of the United States Army Center of Military History
 

004 Army
Military units and formations established in 1932